The 2004 season was the 99th season of competitive football in Norway.

Men's football

League season

Tippeligaen

1. divisjon

2. divisjon

3. divisjon

Norwegian Cup

Bracket

Final

Women's football

League season

Toppserien

1. divisjon

Norwegian Women's Cup

Final
Røa 2–1 Asker

Men's UEFA competitions
Norwegian representatives:
Rosenborg (UEFA Champions League)
Bodø/Glimt (UEFA Cup, Norwegian Cup runners-up)
Stabæk (UEFA Cup)
Odd Grenland (UEFA Cup)

Champions League

Qualifying rounds

Second qualifying round

|}

Third qualifying round

|}

Group stage

Group E

Matches
September 14: Panathinaikos (Greece) – Rosenborg 2–1
September 29: Rosenborg – Arsenal (England) 1–1
October 20: Rosenborg – PSV Eindhoven (Netherlands) 1–2
November 2: PSV Eindhoven – Rosenborg 1–0
November 24: Rosenborg – Panathinaikos 2–2
December 7: Arsenal – Rosenborg 5–1

UEFA Cup

Second qualifying round

|}

First round

|}

Intertoto Cup
No Norwegian representative this season.

UEFA Women's Cup

Norwegian Representatives
Trondheims/Ørn (UEFA Cup)

Second qualifying round

Group 4

Matches

In København, Denmark
 September 14: Trondheims/Ørn – Alma KTZH (Kazakhstan) 3–0
 September 16: Trondheims/Ørn – Energy Voronezh (Russia) 1–1
 September 18: Brøndby (Denmark) – Trondheims/Ørn 0–2

Quarter-finals

|}

Semi-finals

|}

National team

Norway men's national football team

Note: Norway's goals first 
Explanation:
WCQ = FIFA World Cup 2006 Qualifier

Norway women's national football team

 March 7: Belgium – Norway 1–6 European Championship qualifier
 March 14: Norway – Finland 4–1, friendly
 March 16: Norway – Italy 3–0, friendly
 March 18: Norway – China 0–0, friendly
 March 20: Norway – United States 1–4, friendly
 May 22: Netherlands – Norway 0–2, European Championship qualifier
 May 27: Denmark – Norway 2–1, European Championship qualifier
 July 21: Germany – Norway 0–1, friendly
 July 24: Sweden – Norway 0–4, friendly
 September 4: Norway – Italy 3–1, friendly
 October 2: Norway – Spain 2–0, European Championship qualifier
 November 10: Iceland – Norway 2–7, European Championship play-off
 November 13: Norway – Iceland 2–1, European Championship play-off

References

 
Seasons in Norwegian football